Bidarahalli Yadupati Acharya (popularly known as Yadavarya or Yadavaryaru) (also known as Yadavacharya) (c. 1580 - c. 1630)  was an Indian Hindu scholar in the Dvaita Vedānta tradition. He is the follower of Uttaradi Math and the disciple of Vedesa Tirtha.

Life
According to hagiographies, Yadupati was born in Kannada-speaking Deshastha Madhva Brahmin family in 1580 in a village called Yekkundi which is located in Saundatti taluk of Belgaum district. His father name is Yadappayya. His cousin Bidarahalli Srinivasa Tirtha, who is also his disciple was also a Tikakara who composed many works.

Works
There have been nine works accredited to Yadupati, most of which are glosses, polemical tracts and commentaries. His gloss  on Tattva Samkhyana of Madhva runs to 300 granthas. He also made a commentary on Tattvoddyota of Madhva. His Nyayasudha Tippani, a commentary on Nyayasudha of Jayatirtha is the most important of his works. This commentary is distinctly anterior to that of Raghavendra Tirtha and also perhaps to that of Vidyadhisha Tirtha. He tried to overthrow the objection raised by a critic Appayya Dikshita alleging misrepresentations of the Mīmāṃsāka view in Anuvyakhyana of Madhva. Yadupati made two commentaries on the Bhagavata, a work on Bhagvata Tatparya Nirnaya of Madhva and a work on Bhagavata Purana. His also made a commentary of Yamakabharata. There are three minor works ascribed to him one is a commentary on Sadachara Smruti of Madhva and other are praise-poems Vishnu Stotra, Karavalambana Stotra, Daridra Hara Stotra, and Vedavyasa-gadya.

References

Bibliography

External links
Daridrya Hara Stotra (Sanskrit)
Karavalambana Stotra (Sanskrit)

Madhva religious leaders
Dvaitin philosophers
17th-century Indian philosophers